Ivo Serafimov Angelov (born October 15, 1984 in Pernik) is an amateur Bulgarian Greco-Roman wrestler, who played for the men's lightweight category. In 2011, Angelov had won a bronze medal for his division at the World Wrestling Championships in Istanbul, Turkey, and silver at the European Wrestling Championships in Dortmund, Germany. Angelov is also a member of Lovech Wrestling Club, and is coached and trained by Bratan Tzenov.

Angelov represented Bulgaria at the 2012 Summer Olympics in London, where he competed for the men's 60 kg class. He defeated United States' Ellis Coleman in the qualification rounds, before losing out the preliminary round of sixteen match to Iran's Omid Norouzi, who was able to score four points in two straight periods, leaving Angelov without a single point. Because his opponent advanced further into the final match, Angelov offered another shot for the bronze medal by eliminating China's Sheng Jiang in the repechage rounds. He lost the second repechage bout to Kazakhstan's Almat Kebispayev, with a score of 0–3. On 16 December 2013, he was honoured with the Bulgarian Sportsperson of the Year award.

In March 2021, he competed at the European Qualification Tournament in Budapest, Hungary hoping to qualify for the 2020 Summer Olympics in Tokyo, Japan.

References

External links
 
 ANGELOV Ivo Serafimov at NBC 2012 Olympics

1984 births
Living people
Bulgarian male sport wrestlers
Wrestlers at the 2012 Summer Olympics
Olympic wrestlers of Bulgaria
Sportspeople from Pernik
World Wrestling Championships medalists
Wrestlers at the 2019 European Games
European Games competitors for Bulgaria